Syzransky Uyezd (Сызранский уезд) was one of the subdivisions of the Simbirsk Governorate of the Russian Empire. It was situated in the southern part of the governorate. Its administrative centre was Syzran.

Demographics
At the time of the Russian Empire Census of 1897, Syzransky Uyezd had a population of 242,045. Of these, 88.7% spoke Russian, 4.1% Mordvin, 3.4% Chuvash, 3.1% Tatar, 0.4% Ukrainian, 0.1% Latvian, 0.1% Polish and 0.1% German as their native language.

References

 
Uezds of Simbirsk Governorate
Simbirsk Governorate